A  (SARL, S.à r.l. and similar; literally "society with limited responsibility") is a form of private company that exists mainly in French-speaking countries, such as France, Luxembourg, Monaco, Algeria, Morocco, Tunisia, Madagascar, Lebanon, Switzerland (where it is also designated by GmbH or Sagl), and Belgium (where, since 1 May 2019, it is also designated by besloten vennootschap and abbreviated as SRL). The primary purpose of a SARL is to conduct commercial activity.

Proprietary interests in a SARL are represented by shares. They are not freely transferable; unless the intended recipient is a spouse, descendant, or other close relative, transfers require the agreement of half of the shareholders (since Ord. 2 mars 2004).

One of the primary advantages of a SARL is limited liability; an owner or other investor in the company cannot be liable for more than they have contributed to the company’s capital. In this respect, a SARL is largely equivalent to a British limited company or American limited liability company.

France

There are now nearly 1,500,000 SARLs, making up two thirds of all commercial organisations in France. The SARL is particularly suited for small and medium enterprises. A SARL can be broken into various complementary forms depending on the activity and associates concerned, which can bring various benefits in terms of taxation (amongst others): a SARL with variable capital (la SARL à capital variable), a "SARL press" (la SARL de presse) or a SARL family (la SARL de famille).

The SARL pluri-personnelle is a society with a minimum of two associates, and a maximum of 100. In addition, the SARL model is chosen by those who wish to invest but who do not wish to be taxed.

History
The SARL, whose legal character is somewhat ambivalent because they qualify neither as a personal corporation nor as a capital company, was developed in Germany (GmbH) by a law dating from 1893. The legal form of the limited liability company in France dates from 1925.

Legal characteristics
 Capital
 The amount of capital in the company is freely determined by the statutes (Article L223-2 of the Commercial Code). While the minimum equity used to be 50 000 F, then 7 500 €, the Law for the economic initiative of 1 August 2003 has removed that requirement, so it is statutory to open a company with one euro of capital. However, the share capital is a sign of confidence vis-à-vis banks and lenders or creditors. It is also an index for partners because they will be more likely to do business with a company with significant capital because, in case of problems, the partners are entitled to benefits derived from the capital. However, the health of the company is not properly reflected by the capital alone and it is better to study its accounts and balance sheets.
The capital is divided into shares and its distribution is mentioned in the statutes. This will include organizing the distribution of power within societies (combined majority and minority vote in the important decisions). The shares shall be subscribed to by all partners. They must be fully paid when they represent contributions in kind.
 Contributions in cash should be released at least one-fifth of their value. The release of surplus occurs in one or several times on a decision of the manager, in a period not exceeding five years from registration of the company in the register of companies. However, the share capital must be fully discharged before any purchase of new shares to be released in cash, under penalty of nullity of the transaction.
 Contributions in kind (goods, inventory, receivables, ...) must be made immediately.
 Contributions in industry are now allowed (special competence, tour de main, expertise), but they do not fall in the amount of capital social. They can, however, acquire the status of associate and participate in sharing profit. Where appropriate, the statutes determine the method by which can be purchased shares in the industry.
 Associates (individuals or legal)
 Minimum: 2
 Maximum: 100
 Their liability is limited to their contributions.

Establishment of a SARL

Statutes
 The general elements of contract
 consent rules of common law
 capacity
 Associates no traders: civil capacity is enough to be involved. An emancipated minor, a major protected, 2 spouses, a foreigner may be involved. The legal persons may also be involved.
 No incompatibility or ban would limit access to a limited liability company.
 L subject:
 SARL is necessarily commercial whatever its purpose
 Some activities are prohibited: insurance companies, capitalization companies, banks.
 Some activities are reserved for other types of companies: portfolio management, securities, investment companies
 Some activities are reserved for SARL: real estate company management
 Some activities are carried out in SARL under certain conditions: SARL public accountant, legal advice
 Contracts to specific elements of society
 The number of partners: 2 to 100. If the number is equal to 1 partner, there is a transformation EURL. If the number of members exceeds 100, there are adjustments in the year if the company is dissolved or corrected in SA.
 The capital: it is freely set in the statutes (formerly, the minimum capital was 7 500 €); it may be released in whole or in part, over a maximum of 5 years. Subsequently, the creation, capital can be increased (capital increase).
 The capital is composed of provisions:
 The shares representing contributions in cash must be paid at least one fifth of the amount. The subsequent release occurs in one or several times on the decision of the manager within a period not exceeding 5 years from registration. Filed in 8 days with a notary, a bank or the Fund deposits and deposit. Ability to resume fund if not constitution within 6 months of payment.
 Regarding the contributions in kind, statuses must contain the evaluation. A Commissioner for contributions was appointed unanimously by the prospective partners or by order of President of the Commercial Court, a commissioner prepare a report attached to the statutes. This obligation does not exist when the value of any contribution exceeding 7 500 € and that the total value of contributions in kind does not exceed half of capital. The evaluation calls for joint responsibility of members to third parties if there is no external input or if the partners have chosen a value greater than the value advocated by the Commissioner of inputs.
 Contributions in industry are authorized since 2001 (Act NRE) without restriction. But the provision is not entitled to shares, but shares in industry. These are the statutes which will then establish the wage conditions. If the statute does not set the amount of profits and losses will be equal to the partner who has the least shares.
 The capital is represented by shares: 
 The subscription and the total liberation of the shares must be made to the constitution i.e., the signing of the statutes.
 The distribution of shares must be mentioned in the statutes. The distribution of profits and losses is not necessarily proportional to the shares but participation losses can be greater than the parts.
 Specific elements of the society: participation in the profits, affectio societatis name, duration, ...

Formal requirements and advertising
 Status:
 They must be written (in private or by deed) and be signed by all partners.
 In addition to the information common to all societies, we must include SARL for the valuation of contributions in kind, the choice of managers and the distribution of powers, the transfer of shares, modes of consultation with partners and distribution patterns profits.
 In Annex, adding the Commissioner's report to the contributions and the state of acts performed on behalf of the company being formed.
 The past acts on behalf of society not yet registered
 The persons acting on behalf of the company are jointly and severally liable for the consequences of their actions unless the company, having been formed and registered, not to resume their commitments in his account. These commitments are then deemed to have been made from the outset by the company.
 There are 2 automatic processes: acts annexed to the statutes and acts provided by the statutes.
 The publicity measures
 The statutes must be made to the recipe of taxes within 30 days of signature.
 Insertion in a Journal Ad use.
 Linkages with the Official Gazette of civil and commercial ads.
 Registration to Register of Companies.

Taxation
The SARL is subject to corporate tax.

Option: if all members are individuals and family members (spouse and / or children), SARL may opt for income tax (IR). In this case, the benefit is systematically divided between partners and added in the statement of income each.

For the manager of the company, there are two separate systems of social protection:
the status of minority or egalitarian manager and managing Majority status which is determined by the number of shares held by the manager, his spouse and minor children not emancipated. The manager is a minority if it holds less than 50% of shares; egalitarian it owns 50% of shares (same status as the manager minority); majority if it holds more than 50% of shares. Warning: if cogérance, it combines the shares held by all managers to determine their respective social status.

The status of minority manager or egalitarian. It is likened to that of an employee under the social protection and benefits under the general scheme of Social Security. In egalitarian status as manager is likened to that of the minority. It is possible to combine the function of managing minority with the quality of employee. The manager needs to meet the following conditions:
 Hold a position of actual work;
 Engaging in an activity separate from the stewardship;
 Be paid a salary;
 Work in a subordinate relationship.

Note: The existence of a relationship of subordination may not be possible in case stewardship minority or egalitarian. The status of manager Majority. It is likened to that of a shopkeeper. It has, indeed, the same social protection scheme that self-employed (TNS). It can not combine an employment contract with its function Manager in the same company.

Appointment of leaders
The leaders of SARL are called "managers". Any SARL has at least one manager. The manager or managers are appointed by the statutes (statutory managers) or by decision of shareholders representing more than half of capital. That is for the second meeting, however at the constituent meeting 3/4 of the capital in votes is required.

The partners of a limited liability
The associates of a limited liability company (between 2 and 100) have not the quality of trader and may exercise within society gainful activity. As for any legal form, the partner has rights and obligations.

Increase, reduction, transformation, dissolution

The capital increase
In the law of 24 July 1966, there are few specific provisions on the capital increase of SARL. Accordingly, it should be guided by the provisions applicable to the SA.
 The increase through contributions
Contributions in cash ** 
The capital increase will be decided by the extraordinary general meeting since modification of statutes with a majority of 3 / 4 shares. If the statutes have expected, the decision may be taken by written consultation.

 At the first consultation, the Assembly must decide on the most significant (amount, number of shares, amount of the premium, ...). The manager is responsible for underwriting and release of funds since the full liberalisation is required immediately.
 The second consultation endorses the capital increase and amend the statutes.
 If the increase is not achieved within 6 months, providers can reclaim their deposits.
 When subscribing to a third, the recognition is necessary.
 For spouses common property, it is necessary to notify the spouse under penalty of nullity of the contribution.

Regarding publicity:
 – Registration of minutes of the meeting
 – Insertion in a newspaper ad legal
 – Filing at the Registry (minutes of the meeting, statutes, declaration of conformity)
 – Amending the request RCS
 – Insertion BODACC

 Contributions in kind
 The contribution in kind of property must result in a written contract.
 The procedure is similar to that which exists in the constitution: it is estimated intakes in a report to the statutes under the responsibility of a Commissioner of contributions. The contract provision must be approved by shareholders.

Regarding publicity, same as for the increase in contributions in cash but in addition to filing the report of the Commissioner of inputs at the court of commerce.
 Compensation claims in shares
 Either by contribution in kind or by way of compensation.
 Claims must be some offset and payable. Furthermore, this possibility should be provided by the special meeting, which decides on the increase.
 Increase by incorporation of reserves, premiums and benefits
 The decision to make such a capital increase is validly made by shareholders representing at least half the shares and not 3 / 4.
 The formalities are identical to those of an increase in contributions in cash.

The reduction and loss of capital
the Act of 1 August 2003 repealed the exigeance that, except transformation of the limited liability company in another form, reducing the capital below the legal minimum can be decided only under the condition precedent a capital increase intended to bring at least at this level.

we have to refer to rules on the reduction of the share capital of limited companies:
 Nature and motives of the operation:
 the capital reduction is planned in two hypotheses during the life of society
 1st assumption: the company reduced its capital by repayment of contributions. It believes that its capital is too important to the needs of its cash. This case is uncommon, it occurs only in societies that have reduced their activity. Reducing capital not motivated by losses is fraught with tax consequences.
 2nd hypothesis: the company has suffered losses such as depreciation by charging on the future profits seems unlikely, and in any case, makes it impossible to distribute dividends during the duration of such amortization, or society wants to clean up its financial situation and proceeds to reduce its capital to offset all or part of the losses.
 Distinction with the depreciation of capital:
 Depreciation of capital is an operation whereby the company to reimburse its shareholders all or part of the nominal amount of their shares.
 Where possible, this operation is decided by the AGE (C. Com, art L.225-198) and is conducted by prélevements on profits or on résèrves.
 Depreciation is a refund of contributions, as an advance on the bonus liquidation, without changing the capital.
 Condition of the operation:
 EGM decision on reports from the auditors.
 Equal shareholders: the operation may affect the equality of shareholders
 Creditors of receivables prior to the decision may oppose the capital reduction motivated by losses. Otherwise, they have a period of 20 days after the deliberation of the AGE to oppose this procedure.

Transformation
If the company turns into general partnership or civil society, it requires the unanimous agreement of members.

 If the company turns into SA, there are conditions. A deliberation associates representing at least 3 / 4 of shares is required. The balance sheets for last 2 years must be approved by shareholders.
 East demanded a report of a commissioner on the state of society. In addition, the manager will ask the President of the Commercial Court to appoint a commissioner for processing (which may be the auditor). The Commissioner appreciates the value of property comprising the assets and advantages for the benefit of the partners or third parties. He presented a report in which it certifies that the amount of equity is at least equal to the share capital. In practice, it may be responsible for preparing the report on the situation of society.
 The SARL, which turns into SA must follow the rules of the SA-7 partners at least, the capital, the appointment of an auditor, changing statutes, the conversion of shares in actions and respect the formalities of advertising.

Dissolution
 Causes common to all societies
Check the term extinction of the object, liquidation, cancellation of the contract of society, decision associates.
 Other causes
The company is automatically dissolved after one year if the number of members exceeds 100, if the capital is less than the legal minimum; loss of half the capital. However, the limited liability company is not dissolved by the death of a partner (or his disability, his personal bankruptcy, etc.). The limited liability company is dissolved when it includes more than 100 partners and that the situation could not be corrected within the period of 1 year or if the partners could not validly deliberate on the decision to be taken following the loss of half the capital or were unable to regularize the situation within 1 year.

Luxembourg
A Luxembourgois  (SARL) is a corporate form in Luxembourg with limited and closed owner participation.
It is authorized under the Commercial Companies Law 1915, but many changes have taken place as the EU, starting in 2005, imposed conditions on Luxembourg trying to stem the use of Luxembourg corporate forms to achieve extreme tax avoidance or evasion. A SARL has access to tax treaties, which was disallowed for some earlier corporate forms. The situation in 2012 is still somewhat fluid and any information sketched here should be carefully verified.

A SARL is limited to having not more than 40 shareholders, and they are liable only for the amount of their paid-up capital. If there are fewer than 25 shareholders no annual general meeting is required. Currently a SARL must have a minimum paid-up capital of around EUR 12394.68 divided into "participation certificates", which are not freely transferable. An annual tax on capital may be due. There are several subforms, all with their own rules. For instance, a SARL designated to be a "SoParFi" (société de participation financière) is a form suitable for controlling offshore activities.

Switzerland

Legal characteristics
The SARL is defined in the Code of Obligations article 772 et seq. Aside from these articles, they are those of the public limited company will prevail (art.620 et seq). The "SARL" designation is used only in French-speaking parts of Switzerland, in German-speaking parts the "GmbH" designation is used and in Ticino (the Italian-speaking part of Switzerland) the "Sagl" designation is used.
 Capital
 social capital can not be less than 20 000 francs (art. 773  And 774)
 Contributions made in cash (money) or in kind (property)
 Associates
 now one person can be a SARL
 maximum of 100 associates
 Bonds
 Last statutes: name, the company's headquarters, subject to the company, amount of capital and the share of each partner, to observe form for publications. (art. 776)
 Registration Register Trade

Taxation
The SARL and its associates are taxed as a limited liability company, i.e., a tax on income and wealth tax.

Organization
The shareholders' meeting is the supreme power of the SARL. The partners are managers and representatives of the corporation, but can delegate the management and representation to third parties if the statutes allow. The responsibility of the founders, managers, auditors and liquidators is subject to the rules of the SA

References

Types of companies of France
Types of business entity